Richard Diviš (born June 5, 1985 in Trutnov) is a Czech professional ice hockey player. He played with HC Plzeň in the Czech Extraliga during the 2010–11 season.

Diviš previously played for HC Kladno, HC VČE Hradec Králové, HC Berounští Medvědi and HC Slovan Ústečtí Lvi.

References

External links

1985 births
Living people
Czech ice hockey forwards
HC Plzeň players
Rytíři Kladno players
People from Trutnov
Sportspeople from the Hradec Králové Region
Stadion Hradec Králové players
HC Olomouc players
HC Berounští Medvědi players
Sportovní Klub Kadaň players
HC Dukla Jihlava players
Czech expatriate ice hockey players in Germany